The 2015 CAF Champions League qualifying rounds were played from 13 February to 3 May 2015. A total of 57 teams competed in the qualifying rounds to decide the eight places in the group stage of the 2015 CAF Champions League.

Draw
The draw for the preliminary, first and second qualifying rounds was held on 22 December 2014 at the CAF headquarters in Cairo, Egypt. The entry round of each team was determined by their ranking points calculated based on performances in continental club championships for the period 2010–2014.

The following 57 teams were entered into the draw:

Format
Qualification ties were played on a home-and-away two-legged basis. If the aggregate score was tied after the second leg, the away goals rule would be applied, and if still level, the penalty shoot-out would be used to determine the winner (no extra time would be played).

Schedule
The schedule of each round was as follows.

Bracket
The eight winners of the second round advanced to the group stage, while the eight losers of the second round entered the Confederation Cup play-off round.

Preliminary round
The preliminary round included the 50 teams that did not receive byes to the first round.

|}

ZESCO United won 2–1 on aggregate.

AS Kaloum won 3–2 on aggregate.

USM Alger won 4–3 on aggregate.

AS Pikine won 1–0 on aggregate.

Al-Hilal won 2–1 on aggregate.

Big Bullets won 3–2 on aggregate.

3–3 on aggregate. SM Sanga Balende won on away goals.

Cosmos de Bafia won 3–1 on aggregate.

Al-Merrikh won 3–2 on aggregate.

Kabuscorp won 1–0 on aggregate.

AC Semassi won 2–1 on aggregate.

2–2 on aggregate. MC El Eulma won on away goals.

Asante Kotoko won on walkover after East End Lions withdrew.

Enyimba won 4–0 on aggregate.

1–1 on aggregate. Smouha won on penalties.

3–3 on aggregate. Gor Mahia won on away goals.

APR won 2–1 on aggregate.

Moghreb Tétouan won 3–2 on aggregate.

Kano Pillars won 5–0 on aggregate.

Real Banjul won 2–1 on aggregate.

Kaizer Chiefs won 3–1 on aggregate.

Raja Casablanca won 6–2 on aggregate.

Mamelodi Sundowns won 4–1 on aggregate.

AS Mangasport won 1–0 on aggregate.

1–1 on aggregate. Stade Malien won on away goals.

First round
The first round included 32 teams: the 25 winners of the preliminary round, and the 7 teams that received byes to this round.

|}

2–2 on aggregate. AS Kaloum won on penalties.

USM Alger won 6–2 on aggregate.

Al-Hilal won 5–1 on aggregate.

SM Sanga Balende won 2–0 on aggregate.

Espérance de Tunis won 4–1 on aggregate.

Al-Merrikh won 3–2 on aggregate.

CS Sfaxien won 6–0 on aggregate.

MC El Eulma won 2–1 on aggregate.

Smouha won 2–1 on aggregate.

AC Léopards won 2–0 on aggregate.

Al-Ahly won 4–0 on aggregate.

Moghreb Tétouan won 5–2 on aggregate.

ES Sétif won 3–1 on aggregate.

Raja Casablanca won 3–0 on aggregate.

TP Mazembe won 3–2 on aggregate.

Stade Malien won 5–2 on aggregate.

Second round
The second round included the 16 winners of the first round.

|}

USM Alger won 3–2 on aggregate.

Al-Hilal won 2–0 on aggregate.

2–2 on aggregate. Al-Merrikh won on away goals.

1–1 on aggregate. MC El Eulma won on penalties.

Smouha won 2–1 on aggregate.

1–1 on aggregate. Moghreb Tétouan won on penalties.

4–4 on aggregate. ES Sétif won on penalties.

TP Mazembe won 4–3 on aggregate.

References

External links
Orange CAF Champions League 2015, CAFonline.com

1